Lisa Makas (born 11 May 1992) is a Former Austrian football striker, She last played for SKN St. Pölten in the Austrian ÖFB-Frauenliga.

On 10 August 2022, Makas in a joint press conference with fellow Austrian Viktoria Schnaderbeck announced her retirement from football.

Honours
St. Pölten-Spratzern

 ÖFB-Frauenliga: Winner 2014–15
 ÖFB Ladies Cup: Winner 2013–14, 2013–14, 2014–15

References

External links
 Lisa Makas—Profile on soccerdonna 

1992 births
Living people
Austrian women's footballers
Austria women's international footballers
Austrian expatriate sportspeople in Germany
Women's association football forwards
FSK St. Pölten-Spratzern players
SC Freiburg (women) players
MSV Duisburg (women) players
Expatriate women's footballers in Germany
Frauen-Bundesliga players
People from Mödling
Footballers from Lower Austria
ÖFB-Frauenliga players
UEFA Women's Euro 2022 players
UEFA Women's Euro 2017 players
Austrian expatriate women's footballers